The 1999–2000 Toronto Maple Leafs season saw the team finish in first place for the first time since the 1962–63 season. It was also the Maple Leafs' first 100-point season, as well as long-time NHLer Wendel Clark's last season in the NHL.

Offseason
 On July 22, 1999, Syl Apps III, the grandson of former Maple Leafs captain Syl Apps, was signed as a free agent by Toronto.

Regular season
The Maple Leafs had their second consecutive 45-win season and broke the 1992–93 franchise record for most points accumulated in a season. Mats Sundin averaged a point per game, scoring 32 goals and picking up 41 assists for 73 points in 73 games. Jonas Hoglund had a career year, finishing third on the team in points with 56 (29 goals and 27 assists). Goaltender Curtis Joseph set a Maple Leafs record for wins in a season by a goaltender, with 36. The Leafs put Steve Sullivan on waivers and on October 23, 1999, he was picked up by the Chicago Blackhawks. In early 2000, Wendel Clark returned to the Leafs for the third time and had a two-goal game on February 1 in a 5–3 Maple Leafs win at Tampa Bay. In March, the Leafs traded Mike Johnson to Tampa Bay in exchange for Darcy Tucker.

The Leafs got off to a red-hot start to the season, winning 10 of their first 14 games with four shutouts. The team suffered a setback on December 4, 1999, in a home game against the Pittsburgh Penguins. Forward Yanic Perreault was coming around the Pittsburgh net with the puck when Penguins goaltender Tom Barrasso slashed Perreault with his goalie stick. Perreault suffered a broken arm and missed 23 games; Barrasso received a four-game suspension for his actions. Another setback occurred on March 11 at Ottawa, when Senators forward Marian Hossa was attempting to clear the puck out of the centre-ice zone. Hossa swung his stick in a golf-swing motion and caught Toronto defenceman Bryan Berard in his right eye. Berard had to leave the game due to the injury and Hossa was assessed with a double minor for high-sticking. It was the last NHL game Berard would play for nearly a year-and-a-half. Additionally, Sergei Berezin, a 37-goal scorer in 1998–99, missed 21 games for the team, but nonetheless finished with a solid 26 goals for Toronto. Despite these hindrances, the Leafs battled on, defeating four solid teams between March 16 and April 1 (Detroit on March 16, New Jersey on March 25, St. Louis on March 29 and Washington on April 1). The Leafs finished third in the Eastern Conference and first in the Northeast Division—the first time the Leafs had won a division title since 1938. Mats Sundin led all skaters in overtime goals scored, with four.

All-Star Game

The 50th National Hockey League All-Star Game was part of the 1999–2000 NHL season, and took place in Toronto's Air Canada Centre on February 6, 2000.

The all-star week festivities saw the Canadian Hockey League Top Prospects Game played on February 2, and an exhibition game between the Canadian and American women's national teams on February 3. The Heroes of Hockey game and the Skills Competition were held on February 5. It is to note that the opening face-off for the Heroes of Hockey game were Ted Lindsay and Fleming Mackell, two players who played in the 1st National Hockey League All-Star Game.

The week also was a good sendoff for Wayne Gretzky, who had retired the previous season. His #99 was raised to the rafters, despite him never playing for the hometown Maple Leafs, as a show of his number's League-wide retirement. Gretzky also made it clear that he would not partake in any oldtimer or Heroes of Hockey game unless it was held in Edmonton, a statement that was realized with the 2003 Heritage Classic three years later.

Season standings

Schedule and results

 † Hockey Hall of Fame Game

Player statistics

Regular season
Scoring

Goaltending

Playoffs
Scoring

Goaltending

Playoffs

Round 1: (3) Toronto Maple Leafs vs. (6) Ottawa Senators

Round 2: (3) Toronto Maple Leafs vs. (4) New Jersey Devils

Awards and records
 Most Wins in One Season (tied), 45 wins 
 Curtis Joseph, King Clancy Memorial Trophy

Transactions
The Maple Leafs have been involved in the following transactions during the 1999–2000 season.

Trades

Waivers

Expansion Draft

Free agents

Draft picks
Toronto's draft picks at the 1999 NHL Entry Draft held at the FleetCenter in Boston, Massachusetts.

References
 Maple Leafs on Hockey Database

Toronto Maple Leafs season, 1999-2000
Toronto Maple Leafs seasons
National Hockey League All-Star Game hosts
Toronto